The Jackson Guldan Co. of Columbus, Ohio was a manufacturer of stringed musical instruments, operating in the first half of the 20th century.  Most notably, the company produced violins, fiddles, and violas as its primary product.  Secondly, it made acoustic guitars, most carrying the brand name Adjustomatic.  Thirdly, it maintained a toy department that, among other products, made toy violins for children.

Factory Location
The Jackson Guldan factory was located at 165 Main Street West. It was a brick building, three stories tall, with a one-story wing.

Years of Operation
The company was in operation from 1915 to 1971 It is noted that violin imports from Germany undercut the pricing of Jackson Guldan products and led, in part, to its slow decline.

Violins
Most current references to the Jackson Guldan Co.relate either to its violins or guitars.  The company proudly displayed its workmanship with banners such as Made in America by Jackson Guldan Craftsmen, or Made in America by Jackson Guldan Co., Columbus, Ohio, Inspected & Guaranteed.

The violins were its best product, and many are still on the second-hand market.  They are considered workmanlike, designed for everyday use, and often sounding better than their construction would indicate.
They generally are valued in the range of $200 to $400, with an exception one selling for up to $800. Christie's sold a Jackson Guldan violin in 2005 for $180 and another one in 2008 for $125.

Adjustomatic Acoustic Guitars
Most acoustic guitars on the second-hand market are the Adjustomatic brand, noted by the fact that the guitar comes apart in two pieces - the neck and the body, through the clever and simple use of a long screw that holds the neck to the body.  A threaded bolt turns against a small piece of 90-degree angle iron to allow the musician to easily adjust the string action, that is, the closeness of the strings to the fretboard on the neck.  The guitar can be disassembled, reassembled and string action set with the use of a simple screwdriver.

The Adjustomatic guitars measure 36 inches long, which puts them in the Parlor Guitar category.

In the 1950s, during the Rockabilly heyday, the company made an acoustic guitar called the Blue Suede, that is markedly more refined than the Adjustomatic.

References

Musical instrument manufacturing companies of the United States
Companies based in Ohio